Tushar Tyagi born on 27 December 1989 (Meerut, Uttar Pradesh, India), is an Indian FILM Director.  His interest in telling stories and presenting life as an art proved to be a turning point in his decision to become a film director.

Initial life and education

He completed his schooling from Translam Academy International school  Meerut, India. After that, he moved to Roorkee, India and completed his computer Engineering (B Tech) From the College Of Engineering Roorkee.

Journey to cinema

To realize his dreams of being a Filmmaker, Tushar further pursued course in film making from New York Film Academy, New York City, United States. Prior to attending New York Film Academy, he also did a diploma course in Mass communication & Radio Management program from Salam n Namaste Radio, IMS Noida India. In addition, he also pursued course in film and TV production from AAFT, Noida India. Different courses dealing with radio, TV, production and film making helped him to earn both theoretical and practical knowledge. His in-depth knowledge transformed him into a successful writer, talented director and creative filmmaker.

Best work

He always wanted to depict the world experience the way it used to revolve in his own mind, where breathtaking things were created each passing second. To transform this wonderful imagination to big screen, Tushar decided to become a film maker. Here are some of his work, which depicted his ideas clearly:

Lying is done with words, and also with silence (June, 2013)
This 56-minute short English film came in June 2013 (USA). Under the direction of Tushar, this film shows how a man, who is unknown starts convincing a woman to get intimate, causes relationship with her sister to ruin.
Inception of a lost Art (Aug, 2013)
 In this 147-minute film, director (Tushar) presents a mysterious man, who challenges a woman for his art. It is a story of unseen world, which can only be answered by initiating like-minded thoughts.
Behind a Woman's Eyes (September, 2013)
A journey of a woman to find the true meaning of love, whose relationship is dying, has been presented in this film. But, sometimes, we have to lose something in order to appreciate it in the later years.
Gulabee (November, 2013)
Tushar Tyagi directed the movie Gulabee with the collaboration of Audacity Innovative, which is a motion picture company based in America. For the film Gulabee, Gujarat-based actress Avani Modi, who worked as a sex worker, created headlines for her powerful acting. She coped with unprecedented circumstances of life as a prostitute and showed courage to fight with the challenges of her past. The film was rewarded with a Royal Reel award at Canada International Film Festival, Vancouver, British Columbia, Canada.

Films as a director and writer

Films as an actor

Film as an assistant director

Awards and recognition

Awards

 Indian Cine Film Festival 2014 – Best Screen Play award -
 Canada International Film Festival, Royal Reel Award in 2014 (Foreign Film Competition)
 Universal Film festival – Best Cinematography i a Film 2014

Recognition

 Louisville's International Festival of Films  in Louisville (2014)
 New York Indian Film Festival, 2014
 Richmond International Film Festival in 2015
 GNARL Fest of the United Kingdom 2014
 On The Judges’ Panel for 48 Film Project Baverly Hills, La based Film Festival

References

External links
 

1989 births
Living people
Film directors from Uttar Pradesh